Big Spring Township may refer to:

Big Spring Township, Izard County, Arkansas
Big Spring Township, Shelby County, Illinois
Big Spring Township, Seneca County, Ohio

See also 
Big Spring (disambiguation)

Township name disambiguation pages